The 2005 Thailand Open was a tennis tournament played on indoor hard courts. It was the 3rd edition of the Thailand Open, and was part of the International Series of the 2005 ATP Tour. It took place at the Impact Arena in Bangkok, Thailand, from 26 September through 2 October 2005.

Finals

Singles

 Roger Federer defeated  Andy Murray, 6–3, 7–5

Doubles

 Paul Hanley /  Leander Paes defeated  Jonathan Erlich /  Andy Ram, 5–6(5–7), 6–1, 6–2

References

External links
Thailand Open on the official Association of Tennis Professionals website

 
 ATP Tour
Tennis, ATP Tour, Thailand Open
Tennis, ATP Tour, Thailand Open

Tennis, ATP Tour, Thailand Open
Tennis, ATP Tour, Thailand Open